Nowjeh Mehr Rural District is in Siah Rud District of Jolfa County, East Azerbaijan province, Iran. At the National Census of 2006, its population was 3,716 in 867 households. There were 3,416 inhabitants in 934 households at the following census of 2011. At the most recent census of 2016, the population of the rural district was 3,267 in 997 households. The largest of its 26 villages was Duzal, with 532 people.

References 

Jolfa County

Rural Districts of East Azerbaijan Province

Populated places in East Azerbaijan Province

Populated places in Jolfa County